Markino Buckley (born 16 April 1986) is a Jamaican track and field athlete who specialises in the 400 metres hurdles. He is part of the MVP Track & Field Club, which also has sprinters Asafa Powell and Nesta Carter as members.

Career

He started his career in international athletics with an appearance at the 2004 World Junior Championships in Athletics. He set a personal best of 52.03 seconds in the 400 m hurdles heats, but was eliminated in the semi-finals. He took third place at the 2007 Jamaican National Championships, running a season's best of 49.24 s behind Danny McFarlane and Isa Phillips. This earned him the third spot on the Jamaican team at the 2007 World Championships in Athletics, but he did not managed to finish in his first race in Osaka, bringing an abrupt end to his senior global debut.

He made his Olympic debut the following year at the 2008 Summer Olympics and he set a personal best of 48.50 seconds to qualify in the semi-finals. He was a little slower in the final race, however, and finished in seventh place. He ran at the 2008 IAAF World Athletics Final afterwards and took fourth place. He lost out on a place at the 2009 World Championships in Athletics to Josef Robertson, and Buckley missed the competition as an unused reserve athlete.

Achievements

References

Markino Buckley Profile. Sports-reference. Retrieved on 2010-08-30.

1986 births
Living people
Jamaican male hurdlers
Athletes (track and field) at the 2008 Summer Olympics
Olympic athletes of Jamaica